Brigadier General Edmund John Phipps-Hornby,  (31 December 1857 – 13 December 1947) was a British Army officer and a recipient of the Victoria Cross, the highest award for gallantry in the face of the enemy that can be awarded to British and Commonwealth forces.

Background
Phipps-Hornby was born in Lordington House, Hampshire on 31 December 1857, the son of the Admiral of the Fleet Sir Geoffrey Phipps Hornby. He was the brother of Captain Geoffrey Stanley Phipps-Hornby and Admiral Robert Phipps Hornby.

Victoria Cross details
Phipps-Hornby was 42 years old, and a major commanding Q Battery, Royal Horse Artillery, British Army, during the Second Boer War when the following deed took place for which he was awarded the VC:

On 31 March 1900 at Sanna's Post (aka Korn Spruit), South Africa, 'Q' and 'U' batteries of the Royal Horse Artillery were ambushed with the loss of most of the baggage column and five guns of the leading battery. When the alarm was given 'Q' Battery, commanded by Major Phipps Hornby, went into action 1150 yards from the spruit, until the order to retire was received, when the major commanded that the guns and their limbers be run back by hand to a safe place — a most exhausting operation over a considerable distance, but at last all but one of the guns and one limber had been moved to safety and the battery reformed. The citation reads:

The following men were also awarded the Victoria Cross in the same action: Lieutenant Francis Maxwell, Sergeant Charles Parker, Gunner Isaac Lodge and Driver Horace Glasock.

Further information
Following his return to the United Kingdom, Phipps Hornby served as Aide-de-camp to Lord Roberts when he was Commander-in-Chief from 1901 to 1903. He later served in the First World War. He achieved the rank of brigadier general granted upon his retirement in 1918, after 40 years of service. His grave and memorial are in St Andrew's churchyard at Sonning in Berkshire.

Family
Phipps-Hornby married, on 31 January 1895, Anna Jay, daughter of Mr. Jay, of Blendon Hall, Bexley, Kent. They had two daughters:
 Evelyn Irene Sophie Phipps-Hornby (1895–1993), married Brigadier Hubert Francis Lucas (1897-1990), of the Lucas baronets, of Ashtead park
 Betty Angela Phipps-Hornby (1902–1982), married Charles Lansdell Tapply

The medal
Brigadier General Phipps Hornby's Victoria Cross and other medals are displayed at the Royal Artillery Museum, Woolwich, England.

References

Further reading
 Monuments to Courage (David Harvey, 1999)
 The Register of the Victoria Cross (This England, 1997)
 Victoria Crosses of the Anglo-Boer War (Ian Uys, 2000)

External links
 Location of grave and VC medal (Berkshire)
 
Angloboerwar.com

1857 births
1947 deaths
Military personnel from Sussex
British Army brigadiers
Burials in Berkshire
Graduates of the Royal Military Academy, Woolwich
Second Boer War recipients of the Victoria Cross
Royal Artillery officers
British recipients of the Victoria Cross
Companions of the Order of St Michael and St George
Companions of the Order of the Bath
People from Chichester District
People from Sonning
British Army generals of World War I
British Army personnel of the Second Boer War
Deputy Lieutenants of Berkshire
British military personnel of the Bechuanaland Expedition
British Army recipients of the Victoria Cross